Greg Marius Court at Holcombe Rucker Park is a basketball court in Harlem, Manhattan, New York City, at 155th Street and Frederick Douglass Boulevard, just east of the former Polo Grounds site. It is geographically at the base of a large cliff named Coogan's Bluff. Many who have played at the park in the Entertainer's Basketball Classic (also known as the Rucker Tournament) achieved a level of fame for their abilities, and several have gone on to play in the National Basketball Association (NBA).

History
The park was established in 1956 next to  156; the school closed in 1981. The land that the park is on was once the site of the 8th Avenue Railroad Company. Since 1974, the park has been named after Holcombe Rucker, a local teacher and a playground director for the New York City Department of Parks and Recreation. Rucker started a basketball tournament in 1950 in order to help less-fortunate kids stay off the streets and aim for college careers. The players in the Rucker Tournament featured slam dunks, crossover dribbles, and bravado that excited the crowd, a playing style then foreign to the National Basketball Association (NBA).

In June 2017, New York City mayor Bill de Blasio dedicated the court to Greg Marius, founder of the Entertainer's Basketball Classic streetball tournament held at the park. The park underwent $520,000 in renovations between August and October 2021, funded in part by the National Basketball Players Association and New York City Department of Parks and Recreation. In addition to the basketball court, the park has a baseball field, handball courts, children's playground, bathrooms, and a spray shower.

Rucker Park was featured in the TNT television film On Hallowed Ground: Streetball Champions of Rucker Park, which aired in 2000 and won a Sports Emmy Award. It was also featured in the 2018 film Uncle Drew.

In 2022, Rucker Park became the first outdoor venue for The Basketball Tournament, a single-elimination winner-take-all tournament with a $1 million prize, acting as one of eight regional venues of the competition.

Notable players
Although many professional basketball players have played at the court after gaining prominence, many others developed their basketball skills at Rucker prior to becoming notable in the sport, including:

 Kareem Abdul-Jabbar
 Rafer Alston
 Kenny Anderson
 Nate Archibald
 Metta Sandiford-Artest
 Sylvester Blye
 Wilt Chamberlain
 Julius "Dr. J" Erving
 Connie Hawkins
 "Jumpin" Jackie Jackson
 Stephon Marbury
 Jamal Mashburn
 Earl Monroe
 Chris Mullin
 Satch Sanders
 Kevin Durant
 Brian Taylor

 Sebastian Telfair
 Jamaal Tinsley

Other amateur players who made a name for themselves at Rucker but never played in the ABA or NBA included Earl Manigault, Joe Hammond and Pee Wee Kirkland.

References

External links

 
 Court profile of Rucker Park basketball court
 Photo gallery: Hopefuls Tryout for Rucker Park Basketball Tournament

AND1 
Parks in Manhattan
Basketball venues in New York City
Harlem
Streetball
Sports venues in Manhattan
Protected areas established in 1956
1956 establishments in New York City